Dean Ožbolt (December 13, 1967 – May 28, 2003) was a Croatian handball player.

Career
Before discovering handball Ožbolt played water polo in his youth. His first coach was Romano Rubinić with whom he won the Croatian Handball Championship U-16 in 1983.

After playing for one season for Kozala, Ožbolt was invited to play for RK Zamet for which he played for 15 years. In Zamet, Ožbolt helped the club reach the Yugoslav First League in 1987, and reach second place in Croatian First A League which also gave Zamet their first match in a European competition and reach their first final in the Croatian Cup.

He also captained his side from 1992 to 1996.

In 1991 he got called up to play for Croatia to play at a tournament in the United States where Croatia won first place. He also played at a tournament in Sardinia in 1992 where he was named player of the tournament.

Personal life
During his playing career he earned his coaching degree in Pula. On May 28, 2003, Ožbolt died in a car accident on the highway near Novska.

Honours
Zamet
Yugoslav Second League (1): 1986-87
Croatian First B League (1): 1995-96

References

External links
Dean Ožbolt EH Profile
Petar Orgulić - 50 godina rukometa u Rijeci

1967 births
2003 deaths
Croatian male handball players
Yugoslav male handball players
Handball players from Rijeka
RK Zamet players
Road incident deaths in Croatia